Yazıcıoğlu (literally "son of the scribe, clerk") is a Turkish surname and may refer to:
 Ahmed Bican Yazıcıoğlu (died ca. 1466), Ottoman author
 Cafer Tufan Yazıcıoğlu (born 1951), Turkish politician
 Cengiz Yazıcıoğlu (born 1953), former Turkish footballer
 Muhsin Yazıcıoğlu (1954–2009), Turkish politician
 Mustafa Sait Yazıcıoğlu (born 1949), former government minister of Turkey
 Ümit Yazıcıoğlu (born 1958), German-Turkish political scientist

Settlement 
 Yazıcıoğlu, Devrek, village in Devrek District, Zonguldak Province, Turkey
Turkish-language surnames
Patronymic surnames